The 1931 Boston University Pioneers football team was an American football team that represented Boston University as an independent during the 1931 college football season. In its second and final season under head coach Hilary Mahaney, the team compiled a 1–8 record, was shut out in six of nine games, and was outscored by a total of 97 to 40.

Schedule

References

Boston University
Boston University Terriers football seasons
Boston University football